15th Nova Scotia general election may refer to:

Nova Scotia general election, 1836, the 15th general election to take place in the Colony of Nova Scotia, for the 15th General Assembly of Nova Scotia
1925 Nova Scotia general election, the 37th overall general election for Nova Scotia, for the (due to a counting error in 1859) 38th Legislative Assembly of Nova Scotia, but considered the 15th general election for the Canadian province of Nova Scotia